Amanita crenulata, also known as the poison champagne amanita, is a species of fungus that is very common in the Northeast United States.

Description
Cap: 2 – 9 cm wide, hemispheric at first, then becoming flatter. Pale tan, sometimes grayish or yellowish. The volva is distributed over the wide cap as powdery, somewhat paler warts. The color of the warts lends the mushroom the name "champagne."
Gills: narrowly adnate, close to subcrowded, and white to cream. The short gills are truncate to subtruncate or (occasionally) subattenuate.
Stipe: The stipe is 17 - 100 × 3.5 - 16 mm and has a skirt-like annulus that is often quickly lost or left in torn fragments on the pileus margin. The notable bulb usually bears a distinct ring of champagne volval powder on its "shoulder."
Odour: Not distinct.

It is an ectomycorrhizal fungus, living in root symbiosis with a tree.

Biochemistry
Amanita crenulata when ingested can produce symptoms associated with ibotenic acid/muscimol intoxication. It is considered poisonous.

See also

List of Amanita species

References

External links
 Amanita crenulata at amanitaceae.org
 Powdery Amanitas, at mushroomthejournal.com
 "Amanita crenulata, a common, poisonous, misunderstood mushroom," R. Tulloss, 1990, accessed Sep. 2019

crenulata
Fungi of North America
Poisonous fungi
Fungi described in 1900